Southern Halo (1983–2009) was an American-bred Thoroughbred racehorse and sire. In his racing career he ran twenty-four times, winning five races and finishing second in the Grade I Swaps Stakes and Super Derby. He is chiefly notable for his remarkable career at stud where he was leading sire in Argentina on ten occasions and the sire of 170 stakes winners, including 56 Group/Grade I winners, and 16 champions.

Background
Southern Halo was bred in Maryland by E. P. Taylor. As a yearling he was sent to the Keeneland sales where he was bought for $600,000 by the British Bloodstock Agency. He was originally sent into training in Ireland.

Racing career
Southern Halo made little impact as a racehorse in Europe, finishing unplaced on both his starts. He was then sent to race in the United States where he was  trained by D. Wayne Lukas.
Southern Halo proved to be more successful racing in America. Although he recorded no major wins, he placed in several stakes races including the G1 Swaps Stakes, the G1 Super Derby, and the G2 Silver Screen Handicap. He was rated at 115 pounds in the Daily Racing Form Free Handicap for three-year-olds in 1986, 11 pounds below the high-weighted Snow Chief.

Stud career
Southern Halo was retired to stud in Argentina, where he became one of the most successful stallions in the history of South American thoroughbred racing. Among his best progeny is the American Grade I winner and very successful sire More Than Ready. He also sired American Grade I winner Miss Linda, Argentinian Horse of the Year Team, Argentinian champion older horse and miler El Compinche, Argentinian Mare of the Year Pryka, and Canadian champion Edenwold. He sired 173 stakes winners (8.9%) from 1829 named foals.Died on November 19, 2009 in his paddock at the Haras La Quebrada near Buenos Aires.

Pedigree

References

1983 racehorse births
2009 racehorse deaths
Thoroughbred family 16-g